Charles Wilton Wood Greenidge was the vice president of the Anti-Slavery Society in 1968. He was secretary of the society from 1941-1956 and director from 1957–1958.

Early life 
Greenidge was born on 10 January 1889 in the parish of St James Barbados. He was the youngest son of Charles Joseph Greenidge, a  member of the Colonial Parliament of Barbados the West Indies by his second wife, Edith Marion Wood. He was a distant cousin of Abel Hendy Jones Greenidge. He was educated at Harrison College, Barbados, and then Downing College, Cambridge, where he read Law.

Career 
He was appointed a Magistrate in St Kitts, Leeward Islands, in 1919 and Magistrate in Barbados in 1923. He rose to the office of Court of Appeal Judge in 1925. He then transferred to Port of Spain, Trinidad as a Magistrate in 1927. Later, he acted as Solicitor General and then-Attorney General as well as being a member of the Legislative Council. A further posting as Chief Justice of British Honduras followed in 1932–36. In 1936, he took up the post of Solicitor General of Nigeria where he remained for five years. He was a member of the Logang on Development of British Guyana and British Honduras in 1947 and appointed to the United Nations' Ad Hoc Committee of Experts on Slavery 1950–51. Between 1958 and 1962, he was a member of the Legislative Council of Barbados.

Personal life 
When he was not posted overseas, he lived most of his life in Barbados, with a second home in Malta. He was unmarried and died 28 April 1972 in Nice, France.

The Greenidge family traced their ancestry in Barbados to John of Greenwich who left London on 2 May 1635 on Alexander. Within one generation the etymon, meaning Green Port or Trading Place (cf Norwich, Harwich Ipswich and Sandwich in England), he had assumed distinctly the surname of West Africa orthographic format of Greenidge of which he maintained a very similar phenomic identity.

Papers and publications 

 1943: Forced Labour
 1945: Land Hunger in the Colonies
 1947: Impressions of Four West Indian Islands Visited in 1946
 1948: Forced Labour updated
 1949: The Present Outlook in the British West Indies
 1950: The British Caribbean Federation
 1952: Slavery in the Twentieth Century
 1953: Memorandum on Slavery
 1954: Slavery at the United Nations
 1955: Slavery and the United Nations
 1956: Memorandum on Forced Labour in Portuguese West Africa
 1958: Slavery (Published George Allen and Unwin)

References

External links 

1889 births
1972 deaths
Barbadian judges
Saint Kitts and Nevis judges
British Trinidad and Tobago judges
Barbadian lawyers
Colony of Barbados judges
Chief Justices of British Guiana
British Leeward Islands judges
Chief Justices of British Honduras
People from colonial Nigeria
Barbadian writers
Attorneys General of British Trinidad and Tobago
20th-century Barbadian lawyers
20th-century Barbadian writers
People educated at Harrison College (Barbados)